Oleg Mikhaylovich Budargin (b. November 16, 1960) was the governor of Taymyr Autonomous Okrug in Russia. He took office in February 2003 after having won elections the previous month with 70% of the vote. He was previously the mayor of Norilsk.

Budargin's term ended when Taymyr Autonomous Okrug was merged into Krasnoyarsk Krai on January 1, 2007.

References

Budargin, Oleg Mikhaylovich
Budargin, Oleg Mikhaylovich
Governors of Taymyr Autonomous Okrug
Taymyr Autonomous Okrug
People from Norilsk